Castle Semple railway station was intended to be a railway station that would have served the village of Howwood, Renfrewshire, Scotland as part of the Dalry and North Johnstone Line on the Glasgow and South Western Railway.

History 

This station never opened. The proposed location of the station was a short distance north east of Castle Semple Loch, where a widening on the former railway line is still visible. A platform did exist here, used by the workers of the nearby Castle Semple Estate. Had the station opened to the general public, it would likely have been called Howwood or St Bryde's (after nearby St Bryde's House and burn). The trackbed is now part of National Cycle Route 7.

References

Notes

Sources

Proposed railway stations in Scotland